The men's water polo tournament at the 2017 World Aquatics Championships, organised by the FINA, was held in Budapest, Hungary from 17 to 29 July 2017.

Croatia captured their second title by defeating host Hungary 8–6 in the final match. Bronze was secured by Serbia who beat Greece 11–8.

Participating teams

Qualification
 Hungary qualified as host.
 Serbia and United States qualified as 2016 FINA World League finalists.
 Croatia, Italy, Montenegro and Greece qualified at the 2016 Olympic tournament
 Spain, Russia and France qualified at the 2016 European Championship.
 Brazil and Canada qualified at the 2017 UANA Cup.
 Japan and Kazakhstan qualified at the Asia tournament.
 South Africa qualified at the African tournament.
 Australia qualified at the Oceanian tournament.

Groups formed
The draw resulted in the following groups:

Preliminary round

Group A

Group B

Group C

Group D

Knockout stage

Bracket
Championship bracket

5th place bracket

9th place bracket

13th place bracket

Playoffs

Quarterfinals

13th–16th place semifinals

9th–12th place semifinals

5th–8th place semifinals

Semifinals

15th place game

13th place game

Eleventh place game

Ninth place game

Seventh place game

Fifth place game

Third place game

Final

Final standing

Medalists

Statistics and awards

Top goalscorers

Source: SportResult

Awards
Most Valuable Player
 Márton Vámos

Best Goalscorer
 Ioannis Fountoulis – 23 goals

Media All-Star Team
 Viktor Nagy – Goalkeeper
 Luka Lončar – Centre forward
 Francesco Di Fulvio
 Ioannis Fountoulis
 Andrija Prlainović
 Sandro Sukno
 Márton Vámos

References

External links
 17th FINA World Championships 2017 FINA Water Polo website
Records and statistics (reports by Omega)
 Men Water Polo XVII World Championship 2017 Budapest www.todor66.com

2017
Men